Kipkelion East is an electoral constituency in Kericho County, Kenya. It is one of six constituencies in the county. It was established for the 2013 general elections as constituency number 188 when Kipkelion Constituency was split into Kipkelion East and Kipkelion West constituency.

Kipkelion East incorporates Tendeno, Londiani, Kedowa/Kimugul and Chepseon wards. The incumbent member of national assembly is Hon. Joseph Limo. The Kipkelion East constituency area of the former Kipkelion has produced past MPs such as Moses Kiprono of Soget, Kipsongol, Dr Richard Koech, Eng. Samuel Rotich, Dr Sammy Ruto and Bishop Tonui.

Wards 
The constituency is made up of four wards, each of which elects a representative (MCA) to the Kericho County Assembly.

References

External links 

Constituencies in Rift Valley Province
2013 establishments in Kenya
Constituencies established in 2013
Constituencies in Kericho County